CPCA may refer to:

 (+)-CPCA, a stimulant drug (nocaine, 3α-carbomethoxy-4β-(4-chlorophenyl)-N-methylpiperidine)
 Canadian Professional Chuckwagon Association
 Children's Performing Company of Australia
 Chinese Patriotic Catholic Association
 Chinese Professionals Club of Australia
 Cambridgeshire and Peterborough Combined Authority